Aliyev (sometimes spelled Aliev; ,), Aliyeva for females, is a surname originating from the Caucasus and Central Asia. The surname is derived from the Arabic male given name Ali and literally means Ali's. It may refer to:

People

Aliyev
Ali Aliyev (boxer), a Russian amateur boxer
Ali Aliyev (footballer) a Kazakh footballer
Aydin Aliyev, Chairman of the State Customs Committee of Azerbaijan Republic
Aziz Aliyev, politician, scientist, and member of the Supreme Soviet of the USSR, father-in-law of Heydar Aliyev and maternal grandfather of Azerbaijan's current President Ilham Aliyev
Heydar Aliyev, former President of Azerbaijan
Igrar Aliyev, Azerbaijani historian
Ilham Aliyev, current President of Azerbaijan, son of Heydar Aliyev
Mirzaagha Aliyev, Azerbaijani actor
Mukhu Aliyev, president of the Republic of Dagestan
Natig Aliyev, politician, Minister of Industry and Energy of Azerbaijan
Olexandr Aliyev, Ukrainian footballer
Rakhat Aliyev, former First Vice Foreign Minister of Kazakhstan and son-in-law of President 
Yashar Aliyev, Azerbaijan's current ambassador to the United States
Vagif Aliyev, Mayor of Sumgayit, Azerbaijan
Salau Aliyev, Kumyk politician

Aliev
Dmitri Aliev, Russian figure skater

Aliyeva
Aysun Aliyeva (born 1997), Azerbaijani women's footballer
Dilara Aliyeva, Azerbaijani women's rights activist
Kamila Aliyeva, Azerbaijani politician
Mehriban Aliyeva, current First Lady of Azerbaijan
Nargiz Aliyeva (born 2002), Azerbaijani women's footballer
Ulduz Rafili-Aliyeva, Azerbaijani theatre director

Alieva
Dinara Alieva (born 1980), Azerbaijani and Russian opera singer 
Marina Alieva, Russian female singer, actress, dancer and songwriter

Other uses
Heydar Aliyev International Airport in Baku, Azerbaijan
Heydar Aliyev Palace, a concert hall in Baku, Azerbaijan

Azerbaijani-language surnames
Kazakh-language surnames
Patronymic surnames
Surnames from given names
Surnames of Georgian origin
Surnames of Azerbaijani origin